The Socialist Campaign Group, officially the Socialist Campaign Group of Labour MPs and also known as the Campaign Group, is a left-wing, democratic socialist grouping of the Labour Party's Members of Parliament in the House of Commons of the United Kingdom. It was formed in December 1982 following the 1981 Labour Party deputy leadership election when a number of soft left MPs, led by Neil Kinnock, refused to back Tony Benn's campaign, leading a number of left-wing Benn-supporting MPs to split from the Tribune Group to form the Socialist Campaign Group.

It was at a meeting of the Campaign Group in June 2015 that the decision was taken that Jeremy Corbyn would contest for the leadership of the Labour Party. The Campaign Group maintains close links with Momentum.

Origins 

The Socialist Campaign Group was founded in 1982 due to a disagreement within the Labour left, traditionally organised around the Tribune Group, about whom to back in the 1981 deputy leadership election. Tony Benn's decision to challenge Denis Healey for the Deputy Leadership of the Labour Party in 1981 was heavily criticised by Labour's leader, Michael Foot, who had long been associated with the Labour left and Tribune Group. Tribune Group member and future Labour leader Neil Kinnock led a number of Labour MPs to support John Silkin in the deputy leadership election and abstain in the run-off between Healey and Benn. This sowed the seeds for a split in the left between a "soft left" supportive of Foot's leadership and a dissenting "hard left" organised principally around Benn.

The Campaign Group would go on to back Eric Heffer and Michael Meacher in their unsuccessful bids for the leadership and deputy leadership in 1983.

The Campaign Group subsequently organised itself around opposition to the direction the party took under the leadership of Kinnock and his successors.

An advertisement in Tribune (24 April 1983) gave the membership of the Campaign Group as: Norman Atkinson, Tony Benn, Ron Brown, Dennis Canavan, Bob Cryer, Don Dixon, Martin Flannery, Stuart Holland, Bob Litherland, Joan Maynard, Willie McKelvey, Andy McMahon, Bob McTaggart, Michael Meacher, Bob Parry, Reg Race, Allan Roberts, Ernie Roberts, Dennis Skinner, and John Tilley.

Activities and campaigns

During Kinnock's leadership of the Party 
Neil Kinnock was hostile to the Campaign Group. He pursued a 'carrot and stick' approach to undermining the Campaign Group by promoting MPs who were willing to leave the Campaign Group and renounce their previously held views and by isolating those who remained members.

1984–85 miners' strike 
During the 1984–85 miners' strike MPs from the Socialist Campaign Group took action to support the striking miners by visiting picket lines and raising money to be donated to the miners' relief centres. This put pressure on the Labour Party leadership to support the strike, something Neil Kinnnock resisted until 10 months after the start of the strike. Members of the Socialist Campaign Group also led a "direct action protest" in the House of Commons by refusing to sit down in order to force a debate on the strike.

Anti-poll tax campaign 

In 1989 Margaret Thatcher's Conservative Government announced plans to introduce a flat-tax to fund local Government. The planned tax became known as the poll tax and was thought by many to be intended to save the rich money and move the expenses onto the poor.

Only 15 Labour MPs supported the Anti Poll Tax Federation. Socialist Campaign Group MPs made up a significant number of these including Tony Benn, who gave his full support to the campaign and spoke at the 200,000 strong anti-Poll Tax demonstration in Trafalgar Square, and Jeremy Corbyn who appeared at Highbury Magistrates' Court in 1991 for not paying his poll tax bill of £481. Corbyn was in court alongside 16 other Islington residents all opposing the levy on grounds other than inability to pay. He told The Times newspaper "I am here today because thousands of people who elected me just cannot afford to pay."

The scale of public opposition in both polls and in the streets have been identified as one of the key causes of the end of Thatcher's premiership.

Labour historians have identified the campaign against the Poll Tax as a "huge victory" for the Labour left who campaigned in alliance with the extra-parliamentary socialist left "against one of the most reactionary pieces of legislation dreamt up in the modern age". Tony Benn described the relationship of the campaign against the Poll Tax with the Labour Party:

During the New Labour years 

Following the 1997 General Election, 7% of Labour MPs were members of the Campaign Group.

Tony Blair enthusiastically carried on Kinnock's attempts to "delegitimise the left". He sought to reduce the number of left-wing Labour MPs by centralising control of candidate selections and used "open shortlists in a fast and loose way, mainly to ensure that left candidates are excluded or defeated." Labour Party historian Alex Nunns described how "Left-wing hopefuls, like Christine Shawcroft or Mark Seddon, were stopped at all costs. Party workers were tasked with personal lobbying for the leadership’s preferred choice, or were even told to chase up certain postal votes but not others."

Blair's strategist Peter Mandelson reportedly described wanting the parliamentary left to become “a sealed tomb”.

Alan Simpson, a member of the Campaign Group during the New Labour years, described it as "the only bolt-hole of real political thought that I found throughout my parliamentary years ... they were the MPs you would always find on picket lines, at trade union and social movement rallies, on anti-war marches and at the forefront of campaigns to restore rather than exploit the planet."

Opposition to single parent benefit cuts 
Under Blair, the Labour government introduced plans to cut lone parent benefit, a measure which members of the Campaign Group believed would disproportionately harm women. The cut was brought in by Harriet Harman, Secretary of State for Social Security, who championed the cut despite the majority of people affected being women and children who were already poor. Backbench Labour MPs, led by the Campaign Group, opposed these plans, speaking and voting against them in Parliament. Blair ally Patricia Hewitt was alleged to have described the rebellion as a "conspiracy organised by the Socialist Campaign Group"

47 Labour MPs voted against the proposals including Campaign Group members Ken Livingstone, Ronnie Campbell, Tony Benn, Jeremy Corbyn, Ann Cryer, Alan Simpson, John McDonnell, Dennis Skinner, Audrey Wise, and Diane Abbott.

Despite the scale of the opposition from Labour MPs and campaigners, Harman continued to implement the cuts. She was sacked from Cabinet the following year.

Opposition to the Iraq War & founding the Stop The War Coalition 

The Stop the War Coalition was founded in the weeks following 9/11, when George W. Bush announced the "War on terror", and has since campaigned to oppose and end the wars in Afghanistan, Iraq, Libya and elsewhere.

Socialist Campaign Group MPs Jeremy Corbyn and Tam Dalyell, along with Tony Benn, (who had been in the Socialist Campaign Group until he stood down as an MP at the 2001 General Election) were among the most high profile of the initial sponsors of the Stop the War Coalition at the meeting on 21 September 2001, along with figures such as Tariq Ali, Harold Pinter, Andrew Murray and Lindsey German, who became the convenor of Stop the War.

The Coalition organised what is widely thought to be the largest demonstration in British history, when on 15 February 2003, over a million people marched against the War in Iraq.

Campaign Group MP Alan Simpson launched Labour Against The War to coordinate parliamentary opposition to Tony Blair's decision to follow George W. Bush in invading Iraq. Although Blair was able to win these votes with the support of Conservative MPs, 139 Labour MPs voted against his plans for war, one of the largest rebellions ever seen in the Commons.

Opposition to academisation 
In 2005, Blair's government announced plans to encourage every school to become an independent self-governing trust. These schools would, like academies, determine their own curriculum and ethos, appoint the governing body, control their own assets, employ their own staff and set their own admissions policy. These plans were described as intending to "all but abolish local authority involvement in state schools" and Deputy Prime Minister John Prescott argued that it would "condemn a generation of poorer children to ghettos of collapsing schools".

14 Campaign Group MPs, working with other Labour backbenchers, sought to block the plans by proposing an alternative plan for education. John McDonnell, then Chair of the Socialist Campaign Group, argued "Our sincere hope is that the prime minister desists from relying upon a [David] Cameron coalition to force his education policies through in the face of this overwhelming opposition within the parliamentary Labour party."

With Tory support, the reforms were eventually passed by 422 to 98 votes. However, this was the largest rebellion a Labour government had ever suffered at the third reading of a Bill.

Reform 2019–present 
While Corbyn was party leader, from 2015 to 2019, Socialist Campaign Group activity reduced as many members joined the shadow cabinet. The rule that shadow cabinet MPs could not be group members caused difficulties, and this rule was removed, allowing the group to recover to 23 members by 2019.

In January 2020, the Socialist Campaign Group was reformed. It supported Rebecca Long-Bailey for Leader and Richard Burgon for Deputy Leader in the 2020 Labour Party leadership election, which was won by Keir Starmer and Angela Rayner, respectively.

In October, the Socialist Campaign Group produced a pamphlet called "Winning the Future", which proposed solutions to the COVID-19 crisis.

Labour leadership elections 
There have been nine Labour Leadership Elections since the formation of the Socialist Campaign Group: 1983, 1988, 1992, 1994, 2007, 2010, 2015, 2016 and 2020.

1983 leadership election 

The Campaign Group backed  Eric Heffer and Michael Meacher in their unsuccessful bids for the leadership and deputy leadership in 1983.

Tony Benn could not stand because he was not currently in Parliament at the time, having just lost his seat.

1988 leadership election 

During his time as Leader Neil Kinnock moved the Labour party to adopt centrist politics. In the 1987 General Election Margaret Thatcher's Conservatives won a landslide victory and were nearly 12% ahead of Labour in the popular vote.  Following this defeat Kinnock introduced a Policy Review, which many on the left thought would lead to an abandonment of the party's commitment to Clause IV, public ownership and the transformation of society. At a meeting of the Campaign Group following this election defeat, it was agreed that Tony Benn should stand against Kinnock in a leadership election, although Benn himself was reluctant to run. The decision to run led to a number of MPs leaving the Campaign Group including Clare Short, Margaret Beckett, Jo Richardson and Joan Ruddock.

Labour's electoral college was weighted 40% to affiliated unions, 30% to Constituency Labour Parties (CLPs) and 30% to MPs in the Parliamentary Labour Party. Benn secured only 11.4% of the vote (17.2% of MPs, 19.6% of CLPs and 0.2% of affiliated unions). The scale of this defeat was a surprise to Benn, in particular the decline in support from CLPs since the 1983 election, and strengthened Kinnock's position, which he used to take the party further towards centrism.

Following this election the party rules were changed to quadruple the number of MPs required to nominate a candidate to launch a leadership challenge from 5% to 20% (lowered in 1993 to 12.5% for elections where the incumbent had resigned).

1992 leadership election 

Neil Kinnock resigned just three days after he lost his second General Election, and tried to persuade candidates other than John Smith to stand aside so as to avoid a contest. Rules introduced following Tony Benn's 1988 leadership challenge meant that candidates would have to secure nominations from 55 MPs to make it onto the ballot paper. Three candidates sought nominations: John Smith, the favourite, regarded as being "from the right" of the party, Bryan Gould, from the "centre-left" and Ken Livingstone, the Campaign Group candidate.

Bernie Grant sought nominations as the Campaign Group candidate for Deputy Leader. John Prescott, Ann Clywd and Margaret Beckett were the other deputy leadership contenders.

It quickly became clear that the 20% nomination threshold risked eliminating all candidates except Smith:

To avoid this party officials changed the rules mid-contest, at the suggestion of Gould, to allow MPs who had already nominated a candidate to withdraw and support another instead. This ensured that Gould received enough nominations to ensure a contest between him and Smith, and that Ken Livingstone and Bernie Grant were kept off the ballot. Margaret Beckett described this change as "unprecedented".

John Smith won the electoral college vote against Gould with 91% of the vote.

1994 leadership election 

No candidate from the Campaign Group ran in the 1994 leadership election and the group did not endorse a candidate. However, Margaret Beckett, who had been a member of the Campaign Group until 1988, was nominated by 18 Campaign Group MPs, with 5 nominating John Prescott. Beckett's campaign was supported due to her position that Tory anti-union laws should be repealed and that anti-union changes to the party constitution should stop.

No Campaign Group MPs backed Tony Blair, who went on to win the contest.

2007 leadership election 

In 2007 only 24 of 353 Labour MPs were members of the Socialist Campaign Group and party rules required nominations from 45 MPs (12.5% of the Parliamentary Labour Party) to make it onto the ballot paper.

Both John McDonnell, then Chair of the Campaign Group, and Michael Meacher, a member of the Campaign Group, sought nominations to run against Gordon Brown. Both McDonnell and Meacher agreed that whichever of them had the support of fewer Labour MPs at the point of Tony Blair's resignation would withdraw from the campaign and support the other. However, although Meacher gave his support to McDonnell following Blair's resignation not all of his supporters switched allegiance, leaving McDonnell short of the nominations required and leading to Gordon Brown becoming leader unopposed.

As part of his campaign John McDonnell published his manifesto as a book entitled Another World Is Possible: A Manifesto for 21st Century Socialism.

2010 leadership election 

In 2010 nominations from 33 MPs (12.5% of the Parliamentary Labour Party) were required to make it onto the ballot paper.

Socialist Campaign Group MPs John McDonnell and Diane Abbott both sought nominations to run; however, McDonnell withdrew from the race after it became clear he would not receive sufficient nominations, and instead supported Abbott to give her the best chance of making it onto the ballot. Abbott secured the necessary 33 nominations after being 'lent' nominations from a number of MPs who were not supporting her campaign but wanted to ensure that the contest was not exclusively white and male. It has been suggested that this practice of lending nominations to left candidate to widen the scope of debate "set a precedent" for Jeremy Corbyn's run for Leadership in 2015. Abbott was the first black woman to ever contest the Labour leadership.

Despite beating both Andy Burnham and Ed Balls in total number of first preference votes cast (35,259 individual first preferences for Abbott compared to 28,772 for Burnham and 34,489 for Balls), Abbott was eliminated in the first round of voting, as she received fewer votes from MPs. Abbott secured the first-preference votes of 7 MPs: Diane Abbott, Katy Clark, Jeremy Corbyn, Kelvin Hopkins, John McDonnell, Linda Riordan and Mike Wood. Ed Miliband went on to win the leadership election.

2015 leadership election 

The 2015 Leadership Election was the first held under new rules introduced by Ed Miliband following the Collins Review which recommended moving to a one-member one vote (OMOV) system. This reduced the previous weighting in favour of MPs and Trade Unions. The Blairite wing of the Labour Party (including Blair himself) celebrated this reform, believing that the changes would mean that "the next Labour leader will be a Blairite".

At a meeting of the Socialist Campaign Group on 3 June it was decided that, with McDonnell and Abbott both ruling themselves out after having stood previously, Jeremy Corbyn should be the left's candidate for leader. Corbyn was immediately nominated by Campaign Group MPs including John McDonnell (who became chair of his campaign), Diane Abbott, Ronnie Campbell, Kelvin Hopkins, Michael Meacher, Dennis Skinner, Richard Burgon, Clive Lewis and Cat Smith. The campaign quickly mobilised grassroots Labour members and activists to pressure MPs to nominate Corbyn, even if they disagreed with him, in order to ensure a proper debate about the future of the Labour Party.

Two minutes before the deadline Corbyn reached the threshold of 35 nominations, having been 'lent' nominations from MPs who did not support him but were persuaded to nominate him by grassroots members and Campaign Group MPs. Margaret Beckett was one of those who nominated Corbyn despite disagreeing with him, and later described herself as a "moron" for doing so. Immediately following his success in getting on the ballot Corbyn attended a protest against the treatment of women detained at Yarls Wood Detention Centre and against the 13-year detention by the US of British resident Shaker Aamer in Guantanamo Bay without charge.

Corbyn outlined an anti-austerity domestic agenda and an international agenda opposed to military intervention. He campaigned on issues with wide popular support that had been outside of the political mainstream for many years, including rail re-nationalisation, free higher education, regional investment and a higher minimum wage.

On 12 September 2015 Corbyn was elected Leader of the Labour Party in a landslide victory, with 59.5% of first-preference votes.

2016 leadership election 

During the 2016 referendum Corbyn led Labour in campaigning to remain. Corbyn spoke at 15 rallies from London to Hastings to Aberdeen, reached more than 10 million people with his Remain messages on social media, made six statements in the Commons and put forward Remain arguments during interviews on Sky, BBC, ITV and Channel 4. Analysis from academics at Loughborough University found that the BBC had excluded Labour voices during the campaign and instead covered the campaign as a Conservative Party civil war.

When the result of the referendum was announced Corbyn's opponents on the right and centre of the Parliamentary Labour Party sought to trigger a leadership election on the grounds that they did not think he had campaigned sufficiently vigorously for Remain. MPs hostile to Corbyn leaked internal emails to the BBC which showed that Corbyn's team had resisted moves to pursue a more hostile line on immigration and suggested that this was evidence that Corbyn had sought to "sabotage" the remain campaign. Anti-Corbyn MPs had been briefing the media "for months to “expect movement” against Corbyn on 24 June", suggesting that the opposition to Corbyn was not primarily motivated by his actions during the referendum.

In the days following the referendum a number of Corbyn's critics resigned from the Shadow Cabinet and the parliamentary party passed a vote of no confidence in Corbyn by 172 votes against to 40 for. Corbyn promoted a number of Campaign Group MPs to fill his Shadow Cabinet including Richard Burgon, Rebecca Long-Bailey, Grahame Morris and Clive Lewis, and with their support along with that of other left wing MPs and the mobilisation of members by Momentum Corbyn refused to resign. Owen Smith secured the required nominations to run against him.

Corbyn's opponents in the National Executive Committee were alleged by Robert Peston to have sought to "fix" the result by increasing the fee for becoming a registered supporter from £3 to £25 and excluding from voting the 130,000 new members who had joined in the previous 6 months.

On 24 September 2016, Corbyn was re-elected Leader of the Labour Party in another landslide victory, increasing his share of the vote from 59.5% to 61.8%.

2020 leadership election 

Following the 2019 general election, the Socialist Campaign Group reformed for 2019–2024. Campaign Group members Rebecca Long-Bailey and Richard Burgon ran for leader and deputy leader of the Labour Party respectively. Both were defeated by Keir Starmer and Angela Rayner respectively.

Views 
Although the Campaign Group did not require members to adhere to a particular set of policies, the group did occasionally set out statements of principle. The February 1988 edition of Campaign Group News included "The Aims and Objectives of the Labour Party" a statement agreed by the Campaign Group of Labour MPs and circulated "to provide a focus for political discussion and education within the party ... and to be the basis of our long-term political work". The statement set out the ideological basis for Benn's 1988 campaign to be Labour leader. The document outlines a socialist, internationalist and democratic agenda and starts by listing the rights that members thought out to be fought for:

Campaign Group News 

First published in March 1986, Socialist Campaign Group News was the monthly magazine of the Campaign Group. The paper published articles by Campaign Group MPs alongside left wing Labour Party activists and trade unionists.

Issues regularly covered included: women's liberation, Black Sections, international liberation struggles, internal Labour Party democracy and elections, reports from the National Executive Committee, proposed resolutions for Labour Party Conference, socialist economic policy, disabled people's rights, Northern Ireland and the Conservative Party.

As of 2008 the editorial board was Jim Mortimer (chair), Diane Abbott MP, Tony Benn, Jeremy Corbyn MP, Anni Marjoram, Bill Michie MP and Pete Willsman.

A website of the same name, providing electronic versions of some of the articles in the printed edition and lists of Campaign Group MPs, was run from 1999 to 2010.

Membership 
Before 2017, the Campaign Group was only open to backbench MPs; this was reformed to allow all Members of Parliament to be members.

Current members 

The current members are listed on the Campaign Group's Twitter account as:

Former members

Deceased 
The following died while still serving in Parliament:

 Bob McTaggart (d. 1989)
 Allan Roberts (d. 1990)
 Pat Wall (d. 1990)
 Eric Heffer (d. 1991)
 Bob Cryer (d. 1994)
 Bernie Grant (d. 2000)
 Audrey Wise (d. 2000)
 Tony Banks (d. 2006)
 David Taylor (d. 2009)

Left Parliament 
These members left Parliament voluntarily, either to retire or for new opportunities elsewhere:

 Joan Maynard (1987)
 Stuart Holland (1989, left Parliament to return to academia)
 Bob Clay (1992)
 Martin Flannery (1992)
 Don Dixon (1997)
 Bob Litherland (1997)
 Eddie Loyden (1997)
 Willie McKelvey (1997)
 Robert Parry (1997)
 Tony Benn (2001)
 Maria Fyfe (2001)
 Tess Kingham (2001)
 John McAllion (2001, resigned to focus on his duties as a Member of the Scottish Parliament)
 Bill Michie (2001)
 Harry Barnes (2005)
 Harold Best (2005)
 Tam Dalyell (2005)
 Terence Lewis (2005)
 Alice Mahon (2005)
 Llew Smith (2005)
 Jimmy Wray (2005)
 Ernie Ross (2005)
 John Austin (2010)
 Michael Clapham (2010)
 Harry Cohen (2010)
 Ann Cryer (2010)
 Bill Etherington (2010)
 Neil Gerrard (2010)
 Lynne Jones (2010)
 Bob Marshall-Andrews (2010)
 Alan Simpson (2010)
 Martin Caton (2015)
 David Hamilton (2015)
 Austin Mitchell (2015)
 Linda Riordan (2015)
 Mike Wood (2015)
 Ronnie Campbell (2019)

Constituencies abolished 
These members left the Commons following the abolition of their constituencies as a result of redrawing of boundaries:

 Mildred Gordon
 Les Huckfield
 Andrew McMahon
 Reg Race
 John Tilley

Lost seat in general election 
These members lost their seats in general elections:

 Tony Benn (lost seat 1983, returned to Parliament in 1984)
 Bob Cryer (lost seat 1983, returned to Parliament 1987)
 Eileen Gordon (lost seat 2001)
 John Cryer (lost seat 2005, returned to Parliament in 2010)
 Phil Sawford (lost seat 2005)
 David Drew (lost seat 2010, returned to Parliament in 2017, lost seat 2019)
 Katy Clark (lost seat 2015)
 Emma Dent Coad (lost seat 2019)
 Karen Lee (lost seat 2019)
 Laura Pidcock (lost seat 2019)
 Danielle Rowley (lost seat 2019)
 Dennis Skinner (lost seat 2019)
 Laura Smith (lost seat 2019)
 Chris Williamson (lost seat in 2015, returned to Parliament in 2017, suspended from Party then lost seat 2019)

Expelled 
The following members were expelled from the Labour Party:

 Ron Brown (expelled in 1991 after he was convicted of criminal damage)
 Dennis Canavan (expelled in 2000 for running as an independent for the Scottish Parliament)
 Terry Fields (expelled in 1991 for his membership of the Militant tendency)
 Dave Nellist (expelled in 1991 for his membership of the Militant tendency)
 Ken Livingstone (expelled in 2000 for running as an independent for Mayor of London; later readmitted to the party.)
 Claudia Webbe (expelled in 2021 following criminal conviction)

Suspended 
 Jeremy Corbyn (suspended 2020 following publication of EHRC report).

Deselected 
The following members were deselected by their Constituency Labour Parties:

 Norman Atkinson (deselected 1987)
 Frank Cook (deselected 2008)
 Ian Gibson (deselected 2009)
 John Hughes (deselected 1992)
 Ernie Roberts (deselected 1987)
 Sam Tarry (deselected 2022)
 Bob Wareing (deselected 2007)

Defected 
In 2005, Brian Sedgemore resigned the Labour Party whip and defected to the Liberal Democrats.

Resigned 
The following members resigned their membership of the Campaign Group in 1985 in a show of support for Neil Kinnock's reforms:

 Kevin Barron
 Derek Fatchett

The following members resigned their membership of the Campaign Group in 1988 in protest at Tony Benn's decision to challenge Neil Kinnock for the Labour leadership that year:

 Margaret Beckett
 Jo Richardson
 Joan Ruddock
 Clare Short
 Joan Walley

The following members resigned their membership of the Campaign Group at various points in time when they became front bench spokespersons or members of the government, which was seen as incompatible with membership of the Campaign Group until 2017:

 Michael Meacher (joined the front bench 1983)
 Ray Powell (joined the front bench 1983)
 Mark Fisher (joined the front bench 1987)
 Paul Boateng (joined the front bench 1989)
 Gavin Strang (joined the front bench 1992)
 Malcolm Chisholm (joined the government 1997)
 Chris Mullin (joined the government 1997)
 Dawn Primarolo (joined the government, but remained a member until 2000)
 Dave Anderson (joined the government 2006)
 John Cryer (elected Chair of the Parliamentary Labour Party in 2012, considered a front bench role)
 Kelvin Hopkins (joined the front bench in 2016, whip suspended in 2017)
 Jeremy Corbyn (elected party leader in 2015)

The following members resigned their membership of the Campaign Group for other reasons:

 Alan Meale (resigned 1987)
 Gerry Bermingham (resigned 1991)
 Terry Patchett (resigned 1991)
 Keith Vaz (resigned 1991)
 Jimmy Hood (resigned 1997)

See also 

 Jeremy Corbyn
 Tony Benn
 Democratic Socialism
 British Left
 Campaign for Labour Party Democracy
 Labour Party Black Sections

References

Further reading 
 Kogan, David (2019). Protest and Power: The Battle for the Labour Party. Bloomsbury Reader. .
 Nunns, Alex (2nd ed. 2018). The candidate: Jeremy Corbyn's improbable path to power. London: OR Books. .
 Hannah, Simon (2018). A Party With Socialists In It. London: PlutoPress. .
 McDonnell, John (2007). Another World Is Possible: A Manifesto for 21st Century Socialism. Labour Representation Committee.

External links 
 
 Socialist Campaign Group News website archive

Democratic socialism
Labour Party (UK) factions
Political party factions in the United Kingdom
1982 establishments in the United Kingdom
Groups of British MPs
Socialist organisations in the United Kingdom